The 2016 Atlantic Championship Series season was the fourth season of the revived Atlantic Championship. The series was organised by Formula Race Promotions under the sanctioning of SCCA Pro Racing.

American Ryan Norman won the championship winning eight of the fourteen races. Keith Grant had eight second-place finishes but only a single win and finished second in the championship. His brother David joined the series after four races, but captured five wins in the last ten races and finished third in points. American Bob Corliss won a tight battle over Bruce Hamilton to win the title of the Atlantic Challenge class for older cars.

Norman was granted a Road to Indy Shootout seat for a USF2000 drive in 2017, but after the Road to Indy Chris Griffis Memorial Test, was signed to Andretti Autosport to race in Indy Lights.

Race calendar and results

Championship standings

This list only contains drivers who registered for the championship.Atlantic Challenge competitors are scored separately from main championship competitors for season standings.

References

Atlantic Championship
Atlantic Championship seasons